Monika Bytautienė (born 17 March 1989) is a Lithuanian athlete. She competed in the women's marathon event at the 2019 World Athletics Championships. In 2020, she competed in the women's race at the 2020 World Athletics Half Marathon Championships held in Gdynia, Poland.

References

External links

1989 births
Living people
Lithuanian female middle-distance runners
Lithuanian female long-distance runners
Lithuanian female marathon runners
Place of birth missing (living people)
World Athletics Championships athletes for Lithuania